Beggarweed may refer to:

Cuscuta, a genus of parasitic plants in the morning glory family
Desmodium incanum, a perennial plant native to Central and South America
Grona triflora, a perennial plant found in most tropical and subtropical regions